S&M: Short and Male is a 2008 Canadian documentary directed by Howard Goldberg which examines the obstacles that short-statured men face every day in life, love and work. It discussed the psychology, social pressure and discrimination lawsuits around this topic. The film was featured at the 2008 Hot Docs film festival and premiered on CTV in May 2008.

References

External links
 

English-language Canadian films
Canadian documentary films
2008 films
2008 documentary films
2000s English-language films
2000s Canadian films